AmbiVU 3D is a commercial medical imaging workstation that is compliant with the DICOM imaging and communications format. It is designed for high speed volume rendering of MRI, CT, PET, PET-CT and dual PET-CT datasets.

AmbiVU 3D is available as a stand-alone application for Windows and Mac OS X.

Features
I/O, Reporting and integration
 DICOM import/export
 Built-in mini-PACs
 Integration via DICOM push, HL7 messaging, command-line interface

2D manipulation
 Orthogonal and curved Multi-planar reformatting
 Typical hanging protocols
 Typical image manipulation controls (zoom, pan, brightness/contrast, magnifier)
 Palettes
 Common annotation tools for measuring angles, distances, surfaces, volumes
 Image processing filters (Edge detect, smooth etc.)

Advanced visualization
 Volume rendering, isosurface rendering, maximum intensity projection (MIP) and Ambient occlusion performed on the GPU using OpenGL and GLSL
 Orthogonal and camera-based cut planes, with the ability to remove just the tissue
 Thick-plate reconstruction
 Fly-through camera modes
 PET-CT mode
 Virtual colonoscopy mode
 Dedicated mammography mode

See also
 List of freeware health software
 Volume rendering

References

External links
 Ambivu3D website
 Ambivu3D tutorial videos

Medical imaging
3D imaging